Napoli piange e ride (i. e. "Naples cries and laughs") is a 1954 Italian musical melodrama film written and directed by Flavio Calzavara and starring Luciano Tajoli and Jula De Palma .

Plot 
Luciano had to give up singing and his theatrical career following an accident, which made him paralyzed: he is a watchmaker.  when the master blasi, a well-known Don Giovanni, discovers that Marisa, Luciano's wife, has a beautiful voice and gets her a profitable contract, the watchmaker, suspecting an affair, is saddened by it.  blasi proposes to the woman to run away with him and when she refuses, she enters Marisa's house at night and tries to use violence on her.  the woman reacts and in the fight blasi is mortally wounded by a shot from his own gun.  Piero, the fiancé of Luciano's sister, rushes in and in a fit of generosity, to save Marisa, pleads guilty to the killing.  Luciano, as he hurries home, falls from his wheelchair and suffers a serious trauma.  he is exposed to the danger of becoming blind: in order to bear the cost of a difficult operation, Marisa decides to keep the contract she had canceled.  the operation succeeds.  the police discover piero's innocence, confirmed by marisa, who until now had been silent so as not to grieve luciano.  Marisa, although cleared of all charges, feels unworthy to return to her husband;  but after some time, Luciano is reunited with his wife

Cast 

 Luciano Tajoli as Luciano Celli
Jula De Palma as Marisa Celli
 Janet Vidor as  Marcella Celli
Dante Maggio as  Ciccillo
Vittorio Sanipoli as  Michele Blasi
Vincenzo Musolino as  Pietro
 Edoardo Toniolo as  Commendator Alberti
 Nino Milano as  Gaetano
 Maresa Horn as  Liliana
 Anna Pretolani as  Carmela
Enzo Maggio as  The Accordionist
 Carlo Marrazzini  as  Gaetano 
 Renato Navarrini  as The Doctor

References

External links

Italian drama films
1954 musical  films
1954 films
Films directed by Flavio Calzavara
Films set in Naples
1954 drama films
Italian black-and-white films
Italian musical drama films
1950s Italian films